Finlay Forest Industries was a Canadian  forest products company based in Mackenzie, British Columbia.

History 
Finlay Forest Industries (FFI) was established in 1970 as a joint venture between Cattermole Timber and two Japanese firms, Jujo Paper and Sumitomo Forestry.  In 1980, operations were purchased by British Columbia Forest Products (BCFP).  Slocan Forest Products Ltd. and Donohue Inc. acquired FFI in 1994 as equal co-owners.  In 1999, Donohue Inc. completed an $80 million takeover of Finlay Forest Industries. This was followed in 2000, by a $7.1 billion takeover of all Donohue's operations, including their Mackenzie holdings, by Abitibi-Consolidated.  As part of this acquisition, FFI was dissolved as a company with operations now  under the Abitibi-Consolidated brand.

Abitibi-Consolidated operated the two sawmills, including their associated planer mills, the paper mill, and a steam/power plant until 
2008 when the 2008 Recession shutdown all manufacturing operations.

Conifex Timber purchased all assets in 2010 and presently operates one sawmill.

References 

Forest products companies of Canada
Companies based in British Columbia
Renewable resource companies established in 1970
Renewable resource companies disestablished in 2000
Manufacturing companies disestablished in 2000
Nippon Paper Industries
Manufacturing companies established in 1970